Olentangy Liberty High School is a public comprehensive high school located in Powell, Ohio. The school was established in 2003 and is the second of four high schools in the Olentangy Local School District. Olentangy Liberty was rated "Excellent" on the 2013/2014 State of Ohio report card. In 2013, the school received a gold medal ranking as the fifth best high school in the state of Ohio and the 175th best high school in the U.S. by U.S. News & World Report. In 2014, the school was ranked as one of America's most challenging high schools by The Washington Post.

Athletics
Sports offered at Liberty include:

Baseball (boys)
Basketball (boys & girls)
Bowling (boys & girls)
Cricket (Co-Ed)
Cross-country (boys & girls)
Softball (girls)
Field hockey (girls)
Football (boys)
Golf (boys & girls)
Gymnastics (girls)
Ice Hockey (boys)
Lacrosse (boys & girls)
Soccer (boys & girls)
Swimming & diving (boys & girls)
Tennis (boys & girls)
Track & field (boys & girls)
Volleyball (boys & girls)
Wrestling (boys)

Ohio High School Athletic Association State Championships

 Boys Soccer – 2012 
 Boys Baseball - 2018
 Boys Ice Hockey - 2023

See also
Olentangy High School
Olentangy Orange High School
Olentangy Berlin High School

References

External links
Olentangy Liberty High School

Educational institutions established in 2003
High schools in Delaware County, Ohio
Public high schools in Ohio
2003 establishments in Ohio